Robert Martin Enevoldsen (September 11, 1920 – November 19, 2005) was a West Coast jazz tenor saxophonist and valve trombonist born in Billings, Montana, known for his work with Marty Paich.

Career 
Enevoldsen recorded did sessions with Art Pepper and Shorty Rogers, and later extensively played with Shelly Manne. Enevoldsen did most of the arranging for Steve Allen's Westinghouse show in the early-1960s. During the 1970s, he performed with Gerry Mulligan.

In the mid-1970s Enevoldsen taught arranging and directed the jazz band at Los Angeles Pierce College in Woodland Hills.

Death 
Enevoldsen died on November 19, 2005 in Woodland Hills, Los Angeles

Discography

As leader
 The Music of Bob Enevoldsen, (Nocturne, 1954; Fresh Sound, 2006) with  Marty Paich,  Howard Roberts,  Harry Babasin, Don Heath, Roy Harte
 Smorgasbord, (Liberty, 1956) with Howard Roberts, Don Heath, Marty Paich, Red Mitchell, Larry Bunker

As sideman
With Gil Fuller
 Night Flight (Pacific Jazz, 1965)
With Jimmy Giuffre
 Jimmy Giuffre (Capitol, 1955)

With Fred Katz
 Folk Songs for Far Out Folk (Warner Bros., 1958)

With Shelly Manne
 The West Coast Sound (Contemporary, 1953-55 [1955])
 Concerto for Clarinet & Combo (Contemporary, 1957)

With Gerry Mulligan
 Gene Norman Presents the Original Gerry Mulligan Tentet and Quartet (GNP, 1953 [1997])
With Jack Nitzsche
Heart Beat (Soundtrack) (Capitol, 1980)
With André Previn
 The Subterraneans (MGM, 1960)

With Shorty Rogers
 Shorty Rogers Courts the Count (RCA Victor, 1954)
 The Wild One (Bear Family, 1989)
 Martians Come Back! (Atlantic, 1955 [1956])
 Way Up There (Atlantic, 1955 [1957])
Portrait of Shorty (RCA Victor, 1958)
Afro-Cuban Influence (RCA Victor, 1958)
Chances Are It Swings (RCA Victor, 1958)
The Wizard of Oz and Other Harold Arlen Songs (RCA Victor, 1959)
Shorty Rogers Meets Tarzan (MGM, 1960)
With Bud Shank
 Strings & Trombones (Pacific Jazz, 1955)

With Mel Tormé
 Mel Torme Sings Fred Astaire (Bethlehem, 1956)

External links
 Bob Enevoldsen recordings at the Discography of American Historical Recordings.

References

1920 births
2005 deaths
People from Billings, Montana
Jazz musicians from Montana
American jazz tenor saxophonists
American male saxophonists
American jazz trombonists
Male trombonists
Cool jazz saxophonists
Cool jazz trombonists
West Coast jazz saxophonists
West Coast jazz trombonists
20th-century American saxophonists
20th-century trombonists
20th-century American male musicians
American male jazz musicians